Odontosida is a genus of moths in the family Sphingidae. The genus was erected by Walter Rothschild and Karl Jordan in 1903.

Species
Odontosida magnificum - (Rothschild 1894)
Odontosida pusillus - (R. Felder 1874)

References

Macroglossini
Moth genera
Taxa named by Walter Rothschild
Taxa named by Karl Jordan